Ridgefield Township is one of the nineteen townships of Huron County, Ohio, United States. As of the 2010 census the population was 2,329, of whom 929 lived in the unincorporated portion of the township.

Geography
Located on the northern edge of the county, it borders the following townships:
Oxford Township, Erie County - north
Milan Township, Erie County - northeast corner
Norwalk Township - east
Bronson Township - southeast corner
Peru Township - south
Sherman Township - southwest corner
Lyme Township - west
Groton Township, Erie County - northwest corner

The Village of Monroeville is located approximately in the center of the township. A portion of the City of Norwalk, the county seat of Huron County, is presently located within the eastern boundary of the township due to annexation of the Sycamore Hills development.

Name and history
Ridgefield Township was organized in 1815.

It is the only Ridgefield Township statewide.

Government
The township is governed by a three-member board of trustees, who are elected in November of odd-numbered years to a four-year term beginning on the following January 1. Two are elected in the year after the presidential election and one is elected in the year before it. There is also an elected township fiscal officer, who serves a four-year term beginning on April 1 of the year after the election, which is held in November of the year before the presidential election. Vacancies in the fiscal officership or on the board of trustees are filled by the remaining trustees.

Transportation
Due to the lay of the land and early settlement routes, the roads in this township follow no particular pattern.  Important highways include U.S. Route 20 and State Routes 18, 61, 99, 113, and 547.

References

External links
County website

Townships in Huron County, Ohio
Townships in Ohio